Iram or IRAM may refer to:

Computing
i-RAM, a solid-state drive based on volatile electronic memory (RAM)
Berkeley IRAM project, research into intelligent random access memory
Internal RAM, the memory range internal to a CPU

Organisations
Institut de radioastronomie millimétrique, operates two radio astronomical observatories
Institut Reine Astrid Mons, a school in Belgium
Instituto Argentino de Normalización y Certificación, an Argentine institute known as IRAM

Other
Erum (name), a Muslim name commonly spelt in English as Iram.
Iram of the Pillars, a lost city located on the Arabian Peninsula
Improvised rocket-assisted munition
Information Risk Assessment Methodology, provides business-focused  information risk assessment